Sir George Evelyn Pemberton Murray, KCB (25 July 1880 – 30 March 1947) was an English civil servant. The son of the civil servant Sir George Murray, he was educated at Christ Church, Oxford, before entering the civil service in 1903 as an official in the Board of Education. In 1912, he was made a Commissioner of Customs and Excise and in 1914 became Secretary of the Post Office, serving until 1934. He was then Chairman of the Board of Customs and Excise from 1934 until 1940. His son George was killed in action in 1945 and, in 1957, George's son inherited the dukedom of Atholl from a distant relative.

References 

1880 births
1947 deaths
English civil servants
Alumni of Christ Church, Oxford
Knights Companion of the Order of the Bath